Jagger is an English surname. Someone who owned and/or managed a team of packhorses was known as a "jagger", so this surname probably originates from that occupation.

More rarely, the name is used as a given name.

Notable people with the surname include:
 Amy Jagger (1908–1993), British gymnast
 Bianca Jagger (born 1945), Nicaraguan-born human rights advocate
 Charles Sargeant Jagger (1885-1934), sculptor; brother of Edith and David
 Chris Jagger (born 1947), British musician; brother of Mick Jagger
 David Jagger (1891–1958), English portrait painter; brother of Edith and Charles 
 Dean Jagger (1903–1991), American actor
 Edith Jagger (1880–1977), British artist and textile designer; sister of Charles and David
 Elizabeth Jagger (born 1984), American-English model and actress; daughter of Mick Jagger and Jerry Hall, sister of Georgia
 Georgia May Jagger (born 1992), British fashion model and designer; daughter of Mick Jagger and Jerry Hall, sister of Elizabeth 
 Jade Jagger, jewellery designer; daughter of Mick and Bianca Jagger
 John William Jagger, (1859–1930), South African businessman and cabinet minister
 Mick Jagger (born 1943), British lead singer of The Rolling Stones

Notable people with the given name include:
 Jagger Eaton (born 2001), American skateboarder
 Jagger Jones (born 2002), American racing driver

Fictional characters:
 Jagger Cates, on American soap opera General Hospital
 Mr Jaggers in Great Expectations

Other uses
 Jagger (1858–1891), builder of a locomotive (0-6-0T, works number 1884) in 1881 for Newfoundland Railway
 Jagger (animal), the offspring of a male jaguar and a female tiger
 Jagger Library, University of Cape Town Libraries

See also
 Jagga (disambiguation)
 Jaggard
 Jäger (disambiguation) (includes Jaeger)

References 

Occupational surnames
English-language occupational surnames